Jayananda Lama (1956 – 23 February 2022) was a Nepalese folk singer and actor.

Biography 
Lama was born in Bahrabise, Nepal, and won a consolation prize in a national competition when he was 13. He earned his Bachelor's diploma in classical music from Lalit Kala Campus in India and his master's degree in classical music from Allahabad University, India. He worked at the Royal Nepal Academy and in Radio Nepal as the Head of Folk Department.

He made his acting debut in the movie Man Ko Bandh (1973). Since then, he had acted in more than a hundred movies.

Lama was found dead in front of his house in Kaushaltar, Bhaktapur, on 23 February 2022, at the age of 65.

Songs 
Kalakate Kainyo
Mula Ko Chana
Salala Pani
Chuin Chuin Chuinkane Joota
Herdama Ramro
Unbho ta Sailung

References

External links 
 
 

1956 births
2022 deaths
20th-century Nepalese male singers
Nepalese folk singers
Nepalese male actors
People from Sindhupalchowk District